Sam is a given name or nickname, often used by people named "Samuel," "Samson," and "Samantha".

A

Sam Abbas (born 1993), Egyptian film producer and director
Sam Adams (disambiguation), multiple people
Sam Adekugbe (born 1995), Canadian soccer player
Sam Albatros, Greek writer
Sam Allardyce (born 1954), English football manager and player
Sam Altman (born 1985), American entrepreneur
Sam Anderson (born 1945), American actor
Sam Arday (born 1945), Ghanaian football coach
Sammy Arnold (born 1996), English-born, Irish rugby union player

B

Sam Babcock (1901–1970), American football player
Sam Baker (disambiguation), multiple people
Sam Balter (1909–1998), American basketball player
Sam Bankman-Fried (born 1992), American entrepreneur and suspected fraudster
Sam Barkas (1909–1989), English football player and manager
Sam Barlow (disambiguation), multiple people
Sam Bass (disambiguation), multiple people
Sam Beal (born 1996), American football player
Sam Beeton (born 1988), British singer-songwriter and musician
Sam Bennett (disambiguation), multiple people
Sam Bith (c. 1933–2008), Cambodian guerrilla commander and convicted murderer 
Sam Bohne (1896-1977), American Major League Baseball player
Sam Born (1891–1959), American businessman, candy-maker and inventor
Sam Bottoms (1955–2008), American actor and producer
Sam Boyd (1910–1993), American businessman and casino manager and developer
Sam Bradford (born 1987), American football player
Sam Brittleton (1885–1951), English footballer
Sam Brown (disambiguation), multiple people
Sam Brownback (born 1956), American politician, governor of Kansas
Sam Brunelli (born 1943), American football player
Sam Burgess (born 1988), English Rugby League player
Sam Bush (born 1952), American bluegrass mandolin player

C

Sam Cassell (born 1969), American basketball player and assistant coach
Sam Carter (disambiguation), multiple people
Sam Carey (disappeared 1903), American fugitive
Sam Chisholm (born 1939), New Zealand-born media executive
Sam Clemons (born 1978), American football player
Sam Clark (born 1987), Australian actor, singer and songwriter
Sam Clay (born 1993), American baseball player
Sam Collier (1912–1950), American advertising entrepreneur
Sam Collins (disambiguation), multiple people
Sam Cooke (1931–1964), American singer, songwriter, and entrepreneur
Sam Coonrod (born 1992), American baseball player
Sam Cooper (American football) (1909–1998), American football player
Sam Coslow (1902–1982), American songwriter, singer and film producer
Sam Cosmi (born 1999), American football player
Sam Crawford (1880–1968), American baseball player
Sam Cunningham (born 1950), American football player

D

Sam Daly (born 1984), American actor
Sam Darnold (born 1997), American football player
Sam Dastyari (born 1983) Iranian-born Australian Senator representing New South Wales 
Sam Davies (disambiguation), multiple people
Sam Davis (1842–1863), Confederate soldier and spy
Sam Day (disambiguation), multiple people
Sam De Grasse (1875–1953), Canadian actor
Sam Demel (born 1985), American baseball pitcher
Sam Denby (born 1998), American YouTuber
Sam Donaldson (born 1934), American reporter and news anchor
Sam Duncan, Westmeath Gaelic footballer
Sam Dunell (born 1990), Australian rules football player

E

Sam Ehlinger (born 1998), American football player
Sam Elliott (born 1944), American actor
Sam Ermolenko (born 1960), American speedway rider
Sam Ervin (1896–1985), American politician
Sam Eyde (1866–1940), Norwegian engineer and industrialist

F

Sam Faber (born 1987), American ice hockey player
Sam Farr (born 1941), American politician from California
Sam Fatu (born 1965), American professional wrestler
Sam Feldt (born 1993), Dutch DJ and music producer
Sam Peter Christopher Fernando (1909-after 1962), Sri Lankan Sinhala lawyer, diplomat, and politician
Sam Fisher (disambiguation), multiple people
Sam Fletcher (disambiguation), multiple people
Sam Francis (1923–1994), American painter and printmaker
Sam Franklin (American football) (born 1996), American football player
Sam Fuld (born 1981), American major league baseball outfielder and general manager

G

Sam Gagner (born 1989), Canadian ice hockey centre
Sam George (disambiguation), multiple people
Sam Giammalva (born 1934), American tennis player
Sam Giancana (1908–1975), Italian-American mobster, boss of the Chicago Outfit
Sam Gibson (disambiguation), multiple people
Samuel Goldwyn (1882–1974), Polish-American film producer
Ulysses S. Grant (1822–1885), American Civil War general and president of the United States

H

Sam Haggerty (born 1994), American baseball player
Sam Hanks (1914–1994), American racecar driver 
Sam Harding (disambiguation), multiple people
Sam Harris (born 1967), American author, neuroscientist and philosopher
Sam Harrison (disambiguation), multiple people
Sam Hartman (born 1999), American football player
Sam Hentges (born 1996), American baseball player
Sam Hentges (ice hockey) (born 1999), American ice hockey player
Sam Heughan (born 1980), Scottish actor
Sam Hill (disambiguation), multiple people
Sam Hilliard (born 1994), American baseball player
Sam Hornish Jr. (born 1979), American stock car racing driver
Sam Houser (born 1971), English-American video game producer and developer
Sam Houston (1793–1863), American politician and soldier
Sam Howard (born 1993), American baseball player
Sam Howell (born 2000), American football player
Sam Hubbard (born 1996), American football player
Sam Huff (born 1934), American football player
Sam Huff (baseball) (born 1998), American baseball player
Sam Hui (born 1948), Hong Kong musician, singer, songwriter and actor
Sam Hunt (born 1984), American singer and songwriter

I
Sam Irwin-Hill (born 1990), American football player

J
Sam Jaffe (1891–1984), American actor, teacher and engineer
Sam Jaffe (producer) (1901–2000), American film producer, agent and studio executive
Sam Johnson (born 1930), American politician and U.S. Air Force officer and fighter pilot
Sam Johnstone (1933), English footballer
Sam E. Jonah (born 1949), Ghanaian businessman
Sam Jones (disambiguation), multiple people

K

Sam Kamara (born 1997), American football player
Sam Kasiano (born 1990), New Zealand Rugby League player
Sam Katz, (born 1951), Canadian politician, mayor of Winnipeg
Sam Katzman (1901–1973), American film producer and director
Sam Keith (1921–2003), American author
Sam Kendricks (born 1992), American track and field athlete
Sam Kennedy (disambiguation), multiple people
Sam Kerr (born 1993), Australian soccer player
Sam Kieth (born 1963), American comic book writer and illustrator
Sam Kinison (1953–1992), American stand-up comedian and actor
Sam Knox (1910–1981), American football player
Sam Kong, Hawaiian politician
Sam Koch (born 1982), American football punter
Sam Karber, Minnesotan baseball player

L

Sam Lanin (1891–1977), American jazz bandleader
Sam Leach (disambiguation), multiple people
Sam Lee (disambiguation), multiple people
Sam Little (golfer) (born 1975), English professional golfer
Sam Lloyd (1963-2020), American character actor and musician
 Sam Loeffler (born 1974), American drummer for the band Chevelle
Sam Long (disambiguation), multiple people
Sam LoPresti (1917–1984), American ice hockey goaltender
Sam Loxton (1921–2011), Australian cricketer, footballer and politician

M

Sam Mac, Australian radio and television personality
Sam Maceo (1894–1951), Sicilian-American businessman and organized crime boss
Sam Manekshaw (1914 – 2008), Field Marshal of the Indian Army
Sam Mackinnon, former Australian basketball player
Sam Mangubat ( December 21, 1990)-Filipino singer, born Samuel Marbella Mangubat in Calamba, Laguna
Sam Manning (disambiguation), multiple people
Sam Match (1923–2010), American tennis player
Sam Mayes (born 1994), Australian rules footballer
Sam McCullum (born 1952), American football player
Sam McDowell (born 1943), American baseball pitcher
Sam McIntosh (born 1990), Australian parathlete
Sam McKendry (born 1989), New Zealand Rugby League player
Sam Mele (born 1922), American baseball right fielder, manager, coach and scout
Sam Mendes (born 1965), English stage and film director
Sam Mewis (born 1992), American soccer player
Sam Milby (born 1984), Filipino-American actor and singer
Sam Mitchell (disambiguation), multiple people
Sam Moa (born 1986), Tongan-New Zealand Rugby League player
Sam Moll (born 1992), American baseball player
Sam Montgomery (born 1990), American football player
Sam Moran (born 1978), Australian entertainer 
Sam Moskowitz (1920–1997), American science fiction writer, critic, and historian
Sam Mustipher (born 1996), American football player
Sam Myhrman (1912–1965), Swedish Air Force major general
Sam Mvimbi (born 1999), is a South African field hockey player

N

Sam Neill (born 1947), New Zealand actor
Sam Newfield (1899–1964), American film director
Sam Newman (born 1945), Australian rules football player and television personality
Sam Nixon (born 1986), English singer and television presenter
Sam Nogajski (born 1979), Australian cricket umpire
Sam Nunn (born 1938), American lawyer and politician from Georgia

O
Sam Okuayinonu (born 1998), Liberian-American football player
Sam Okyere (born 1991), Ghanaian television personality

P

Sam Paulescu (born 1984), American football punter
Sam Peckinpah (1925–1984), American filmmaker and screenwriter
Sam Perrett (born 1985), New Zealand Rugby League player
Sam Perrin (1901–1998), American Emmy Award-winning screenwriter
Sam Phillips (1923–2003), American record producer
Sam Pollock (1925–2007), Canadian sports executive
Sam Posey (born 1944), American racecar driver and sports broadcast journalist
Sam Prekop (born 1964), American rock/pop musician
Sam Presti (born 1977), general manager of the NBA's Oklahoma City Thunder since 2007
Sam C. Pointer Jr. (1934–2008), American attorney and federal judge

Q
Sam Qualiana (born 1986), American filmmaker and actor
Sam Querrey (born 1987), American tennis player

R

Sam Raben (born 1997), American soccer player
Sam Raimi (born 1959), American film director, producer, actor and writer
Sam Rayburn (1882–1961), American politician from Texas
Sam Register (born 1969), American television producer and businessman
Sam Rice (1890–1974), American baseball pitcher and right fielder
Sam Riegel (born 1976), American voice actor, writer and director
Sam Rivers (jazz musician) (1923–2011), American jazz musician and composer
Sam Robards (born 1961), American actor
Sam Roberts (disambiguation), multiple people
Sam Robertson (born 1985), Scottish actor
Sam Rockwell (born 1968), American actor
Sam Roddick (born 1971), British entrepreneur, founder of Coco de Mer
Sam Rogers (fullback) (born 1995), American football player
Sam Rosen (disambiguation), multiple people
Sam Rothschild (1899–1987), Canadian ice hockey player
Sam Russell (disambiguation), multiple people
Sam Ryan (born 1969), American sportscaster

S

Sam Samore, American artist
Sam Schachter (born 1990), Canadian Olympic beach volleyball player
Sam Schwartzstein (born 1989), American football player
Sam Sebo (1906–1933), American football player
Sam Selman (born 1990), American baseball player
Sam Shaw (disambiguation), multiple people
Sam Shepard (1943-2017), American playwright, actor, author, screenwriter, and director
Sam Shepherd (disambiguation), multiple people
Sam Shilton (born 1978), English footballer
Sam S. Shubert (1878–1905), American producer and theatre owner and operator
Sam Simmons (disambiguation), multiple people
Sam Simon (1955–2015), American television producer and writer, developer of The Simpsons
Sam Singer (born 1995), American-Israeli basketball player for Israeli team Bnei Herzliya
 Sam Sloma (born 1982), English football player
Sam Sloman (born 1997), American football player
Sam Smith (disambiguation), multiple people
Sam Snead (1912–2002), American professional golfer
Sam Sneed (born 1968), American producer and rapper
Sam Sodje (born 1979), Nigerian footballer
Sam Sparro (born 1983), Australian singer, songwriter, and producer
Sam Spiegel (1901–1985), Austrian-born American independent film producer
Sam Sweeney (born 1989), English folk musician

T

Sam Tamburo (1926–1998), American football player
Sam Tanenhaus (born 1955), American historian, biographer, and journalist
Sam Taylor-Johnson (born 1967), English filmmaker, photographer and visual artist
Sam Tecklenburg (born 1997), American football player
Sam Thaiday (born 1985), Australian rugby league footballer
Sam Thomas (disambiguation), multiple people
Sam Tillen (born 1985), English footballer
Sam Torrance (born 1953), Scottish golfer
Sam Trammell (born 1969), American actor

V
Sam Vincent (disambiguation), multiple people
Sam Virgo (born 1985), Australian rules footballer

W

Sam Walton (1918–1992), American businessman and entrepreneur
Sam Walton (American football) (1943–2002), American football player
Sam Wang (disambiguation), multiple people
Sam Warburg (born 1983), American tennis player
Sam Warner (1887–1927), American film producer, co-founder and chief executive officer of Warner Bros. Studios
Sam Waterston (born 1940), American actor, producer and director
Sam Watson (disambiguation), multiple people
Sam Watters (born 1970), American songwriter and record producer
Sam Weaver (1909–1985), English footballer
Sam Weaver (baseball) (1855–1914), American baseball player
Sam Webb (disambiguation), multiple people
Sam Webster (disambiguation), multiple people
Sam Weir (disambiguation), multiple people
Sam Weller (disambiguation), multiple people
Sam Welsford (born 1996), Australian racing cyclist
Sam Whiteman (disambiguation), multiple people
Sam Wilder (disambiguation), multiple people
Sam Williams (disambiguation), multiple people
Sam Winnall (born 1991), English footballer
Sam Wood (1883–1949), American film director and producer
Sam Worthington (born 1976), Australian actor
Sam Wright (disambiguation), multiple people
Sam Wyly (born 1934), American entrepreneur, businessman, philanthropist, and campaign contributor

Y
Sam Yorty (1909–1998), American politician from California
Sam Young (disambiguation), multiple people
Sam Younger (born 1951), British media and charity manager

Fictional characters
Sam, a character in the 2000 American fantasy-comedy TV movie Life-Size
Sam, one of the two main characters in the 2022 American comedy movie Sam & Kate
Sam Bains, a character from the movie Back to the Future
Samantha Carter, in the TV show Stargate SG-1
Samuel "Sam" Drake, from Uncharted 4: A Thief's End
Sam Porter Bridges, the protagonist of Death Stranding
 Samuel "Sam", a character from Total Drama: Revenge of the Island
Sam Eagle, from The Muppet Show
Sam Emerson, a character from the film The Lost Boys
Sam Fisher (Splinter Cell), protagonist of the Splinter Cell video game series
 Sam Flusky, protagonist of the novel and film Under Capricorn
Sam Flynn, protagonist of the film Tron: Legacy
Samwise Gamgee, in J. R. R. Tolkien's legendarium
 Samantha "Sam" Giddings, one of eight protagonist in the survival horror game Until Dawn
 Sam Gideon, the main character in Vanquish
 Samantha "Sam" Kanisky, a character on the American television sitcom Gimme a Break
 Sam Loomis, character in the novel and film Psycho
 Sam Malone, character on the American sitcom television series Cheers
 Samantha "Sam" Manson, cartoon character in the TV series Danny Phantom
 Sam McKinney, a character in the American television sitcom Diff'rent Strokes
 Samantha "Sam" Micelli, a character in the TV show Who's the Boss?
 Samantha "Sam" Milano, a character in the TV sitcom Step by Step
 Samantha "Sam" Montgomery, in the film A Cinderella Story
 Samantha "Sam" Moore, a character in the 1989 action movie No Holds Barred
Sam Puckett (iCarly), in the TV show iCarly
Sam Puckett (Sam & Cat), in the TV show Sam & Cat
 Samuel "Jetstream Sam" Rodrigues, a character in Metal Gear Rising: Revengeance
Sam Seaborn, on the TV series The West Wing portrayed by Rob Lowe
 Sam Sharp, The Loud House character
Sam Spade, protagonist in the novel and film The Maltese Falcon
 Sam Sparks, a character in Cloudy with a Chance of Meatballs and Cloudy with a Chance of Meatballs 2
Samwell Tarly, in George R. R. Martin's A Song of Fire and Ice book series, and the TV show Game of Thrones adapted from the same series
 Sam Uley, a character in the novel and movie Twilight
Sam Vimes, is a fictional character in Terry Pratchett's Discworld series
 Sam Wilson, Marvel superhero the Falcon
Sam Winchester, one of the two protagonists of the American drama television series Supernatural
Sam Witwicky, protagonist of the first three Transformers films; portrayed by Shia LaBeouf
Toucan Sam, cartoon mascot for Kellogg's Froot Loops breakfast cereal
Uncle Sam, a personification of the United States government
 Sam, character in the film Casablanca
 Sam, onion farmer in the novel Holes and its film adaptation
 Sam, character in the novel and film The Magnificent Ambersons
 Sam, of the American comic character duo Sam & Max
 Sam-I-Am, a character in the Dr. Seuss book Green Eggs and Ham
Sam (Totally Spies), main character in the French animated show Totally Spies!
 Sam, the title character in Fireman Sam
 Sam Lawton, the protagonist in Final Destination 5
Pajama Sam, protagonist of the adventure series "Pajama Sam" by Humongous Entertainment
Sam, the title character on Sam and Friends
 SAM or S.A.M., a character from The Outer Worlds
Yosemite Sam and Sam Sheepdog, two Looney Tunes characters

See also
Sam (surname)
Sam (disambiguation)
Sammy (disambiguation)

English-language masculine given names
English masculine given names
English feminine given names
Unisex given names
English unisex given names
English-language unisex given names
Hypocorisms